The Story of Tracy Beaker (informally known as Tracy Beaker or TSOTB) is a British television programme series adapted from the book of the same name by Jacqueline Wilson. It ran on CBBC for five series, from January 2002 to December 2005 and also contained a feature-length episode, Tracy Beaker: The Movie of Me, broadcast in February 2004, as well as a week of interactive episodes for Children in Need. The theme song was written and produced by Brian Harris and Nigel Lowis and performed by Keisha White.

It has become one of CBBC's most popular and repeated programmes, and still airs, however sporadically, on the channel as of 2022. Subsequently, it has spawned a number of spin-offs; Tracy Beaker Returns in 2010, which was followed up by The Dumping Ground in 2013, My Mum Tracy Beaker and The Beaker Girls in 2021.

Production
The Story of Tracy Beaker, written by Jacqueline Wilson, was first published in 1991. Wilson's book Cliffhanger had previously been adapted as a two-part drama for television in 1995, though this was the first of her works to become a fully fledged series. The first series was filmed on location at Amherst Lodge in Ealing, which doubled as the care home Stowey House, during Summer 2001. The building, which was a former maternity home and children's home, was sold by Ealing Council shortly after the series aired, and production moved to Cardiff for series 2. Amherst Lodge has since been developed into flats.

Due to a change in production location, many of the cast from the first series departed; Jay Haher (Zac Patterson), Sonny Muslim (Ryan Patterson), Joe Starrs (Peter Ingham) and Jerome Holder (Maxy King). The building used across the second and third series, plus Tracy Beaker: The Movie of Me was The Hollies, a former nursing home on Station Road in Llanishen. No reference was made to the change in location and the children's home continued to be known as Stowey House. The Hollies now houses private offices.

The fourth series was filmed at Skomer House, on Marine Parade in Penarth, and the change in location was addressed within the programme for the first time, and the children's home was named as Cliffside during the series. The building, which was once a nursing home, has since been redeveloped into a luxury hotel and spa, Holm House.

The fifth and final series saw another change in production location, with the Elm Tree House School in Llandaff doubling as another new care home, Elm Tree House, taking inspiration from the real building. After production ended, the former school was demolished to make way for a small housing development. The name of the building was retained for Tracy Beaker Returns and the first series of The Dumping Ground, regardless of being filmed in Newcastle and not Cardiff.

Episodes

The pilot episode aired on 8 January 2002 and the series finale aired on 9 December 2005. The show spanned a total of five series with 120 episodes in total.

Series 1 builds upon the characters introduced within Jacqueline Wilson's books; Tracy (Dani Harmer), Justine (Montanna Thompson), Louise (Chelsie Padley), Peter Ingham (Joe Starrs), Elaine Boyak (Nisha Nayar), Jenny (Sharlene Whyte) and Cam (Lisa Coleman), whilst introducing other caseworkers and children who live in Stowey House. Three episodes in Series 1 form the basis of the show and make the format and atmosphere easy to understand, "Sneaking in Ben" shows Tracy's friendships, "The Truth Is Revealed" shows Tracy's way of thinking and "Friend" shows Tracy's way of understanding things.

Cast and characters

Home releases
The Story of Tracy Beaker has been released on DVD in the UK by Right Entertainment and Universal Pictures UK, under license from the BBC.

Note: All of the series DVDs and the boxset contain only the 'best' episodes of that series, the only time all of the episodes were released on DVD was in a special collector's edition set, where one DVD containing several episodes was released each week for purchase. There were 24 DVDs in all, and these are now incredibly rare to find as a complete set. All episodes on Series 1 – 4's DVDs are compilations so there are 6 28 minute compilations which is 12 14 minute episodes, however Series 5 contains single episodes.

Awards and nominations

Reruns
When the series ended, repeats of the series were shown almost all the time on the CBBC channel until 24 March 2016 (stopping part-way through series 5). However, all episodes were released on the BBC iPlayer in July 2017 and remained there until the end of the year. The episodes returned in September 2018, and on 2 December 2018, the movie was shown again, followed by two episodes of the show on 3 and 4 December 2018. The movie continues to be broadcast regularly, and the series returned to the iPlayer in May 2019. The series was repeated again on CBBC from 4 January 2021.

See also
 Punky Brewster, a U.S. TV series with largely the same premise, as well as a similar main character.
 Lizzie McGuire, a U.S. TV series most commonly associated with the "animated thoughts/reactions" concept.

References

External links

 

2000s British children's television series
2002 British television series debuts
2005 British television series endings
The Story of Tracy Beaker
Tracy Beaker series
British television shows based on children's books
CBBC shows
BBC children's television shows
Television shows set in Newcastle upon Tyne
English-language television shows
Television series by Universal Television
Television series about orphans
Television series about children
Television series about teenagers